Hampton is a city in Bradford County, Florida, United States. The population was 500 at the 2010 census.

History

Early history

Hampton was incorporated in 1925. At the time, it was at the junction of the Georgia Southern and Florida Railway and the Seaboard Air Line Railroad with stations for both.

In the mid 1990s, Hampton annexed a short stretch of U.S. Highway 301 west of the city in order to obtain revenue from traffic tickets issued to motorists driving on that highway. At the peak of this time before the dismantling of the police department, it had 1 officer per 25 residents.

2013–2014 controversies

In November 2013, the city's mayor Barry Layne Moore was arrested for selling Oxycodone.

On February 10, 2014, auditors from the Florida Joint Legislative Auditing Committee presented 31 violations of state law, city charter and federal tax requirements to state legislators. The city made $211,328 ticketing people driving its  of U.S. Highway 301 during 2012, giving the city an unenviable reputation as a "speed trap". The committee asked State Attorney Bill Cervone to investigate any potential criminal activity and a number of state representatives and senators pursued the dissolution of Hampton. In the wake of the controversy, many city officials resigned. State legislators visited Hampton on March 28, 2014 to see if the issues had been solved. They agreed to let Hampton stay incorporated, because the city retracted the annexation of U.S. Highway 301 and decommissioned its police force. Hampton also accounted for budget shortfalls, and reformed its city council proceedings. The justification for the speed trap was deemed invalid from its inception by Reason magazine, which reported in May of 2022 that, "Many speed-trap towns defend their aggressive traffic enforcement on ostensible public safety grounds. But Hampton could not even make that sort of claim, since the highway was a mile away."

Geography

Hampton is located in southern Bradford County at  (29.864261, –82.136761).

Demographics

As of the census of 2000, there were 431 people, 160 households, and 110 families residing in the city. The racial makeup of the city was 87.01% White, 11.14% African American, 0.23% Native American, and 1.62% from two or more races. Hispanic or Latino of any race were 1.16% of the population.

There were 160 households, out of which 37.5% had children under the age of 18 living with them, 48.8% were married couples living together, 15.6% had a female householder with no husband present, and 31.3% were non-families. 27.5% of all households were made up of individuals, and 16.3% had someone living alone who was 65 years of age or older.  The average household size was 2.54 and the average family size was 3.07.

In the city, the population was spread out, with 26.9% under the age of 18, 10.9% from 18 to 24, 26.0% from 25 to 44, 19.7% from 45 to 64, and 16.5% who were 65 years of age or older.  The median age was 37 years. For every 100 females, there were 98.6 males.  For every 100 females age 18 and over, there were 93.3 males.

The median income for a household in the city was $24,091, and the median income for a family was $29,375. Males had a median income of $23,250 versus $20,000 for females. The per capita income for the city was $14,620.  About 20.4% of families and 26.6% of the population were below the poverty line, including 32.8% of those under age 18 and 38.3% of those age 65 or over.

See also

 New Rome, Ohio – a village that was dissolved in 2004 for speed traps and corruption
 Ludowici, Georgia – another Deep South municipality that was notorious for speed traps and merchant fraud in the 1950s and 1960s
 Waldo, Florida – another Florida "speed trap" town, that disbanded its police force in 2014

References

External links 

Cities in Bradford County, Florida
Cities in Florida
1925 establishments in Florida
Populated places established in 1925